International Association of Methodist-related Schools, Colleges, and Universities (IAMSCU) is a private, not-for-profit organization of schools, colleges and universities associated with Methodist-Wesleyan tradition. All the member institutions have a current or historical affiliation with a Methodist denomination. Most institutions are legally autonomous under their own boards of trustees and separately chartered by their respective states. IAMSCU seeks to enable Methodist-related educational institutions and those with a Methodist tradition to cooperate through the development of common understandings.

US Member Schools

External links
 IAMSCU official website

Methodist organizations
College and university associations and consortia in the United States